Llanover House, Llanover, Monmouthshire, Wales, was a country house dating from the mid-19th century. Commissioned by Augusta Waddington, and her husband Benjamin Hall, later Baron Llanover, the house was designed by Thomas Hopper and was largely complete by 1837. Lady Llanover was an early champion of Welsh culture and the house became a centre for its investigation and promotion. In the grounds, the Halls created an extensive park. On the wider Ty Uchaf estate, which Lady Llanover had inherited from her father, the Halls created a model estate village, with housing for their workers, chapels, schools, police and fire services, and temperance public houses, as Lady Llanover was also a champion of abstinence. After Lord Llanover's death in 1867, his widow continued to live at the house until her own death in 1896.

The house survived her by some 40 years and was demolished in 1936. The Llanover estate remains in the ownership of her descendants. It is designated at Grade II* on the Cadw/ICOMOS Register of Parks and Gardens of Special Historic Interest in Wales. The gardens and grounds are occasionally open to the public.

History
Benjamin Waddington, originally from Nottinghamshire, bought the Ty Uchaf estate in Monmouthshire in around 1792. He built a house, Ty Uchaf, and laid out an extensive park. His daughter, Augusta was born at the house in March 1802. In 1823, Augusta married Benjamin Hall, a successful engineer and politician, and owner of the adjacent Llanover estate, which was united with Ty Uchaf on Augusta's inheriting following the death of her father. In 1828 the Halls determined to build a new house at the centre of their unified estate. Thomas Hopper was commissioned to design a large, three-storey, house, in a Jacobethan style. Building was complete by 1837.

The Halls devoted considerable attention to the development of Llanover as a model estate village, although John Newman, in his Gwent/Monmouthshire volume of the Pevsner Buildings of Wales, notes that much of the current building estate dates from the time of their grandson, Ivor Herbert, 1st Baron Treowen. In addition to the construction of cottages for the estate workers, schools for their children, and chapels for them all to worship in, Lady Llanover established a number of temperance inns, as a firm advocate of abstinence.

Lady Llanover's first passion, however, was the promotion of Welsh culture and language. A Welsh speaker herself, she employed Welsh-speaking servants, had instruction in her estate schools undertaken in Welsh, and required that the services at St Bartholomew's Church were conducted in Welsh. At a national level, Lady Llanover supported the Cymreigyddion Society, funded Daniel Silvan Evans in the production of his Welsh dictionary, purchased the Llanover Manuscripts collection from the son of Iolo Morganwg, supported the Eisteddfod movement, adopting her own bardic name, 'Gwenynen Gwent' (The Bee of Gwent), and encouraged the study and use of the Welsh harp and Welsh costume.

Lord Llanover died in 1867 and was buried at St Bartholomew's. Lady Llanover outlasted him by 30 years, although becoming increasingly withdrawn from society. She died in 1898 and was buried in the family tomb, following a service conducted in Welsh. 

Llanover House was demolished in 1936. The Llanover Estate remains a privately owned estate in possession of the Hall's descendants. The gardens are occasionally opened to the public.

Architecture and description
LLanover House was built in a Jacobethan style, with three main storeys and grouped sets of chimney stacks. After demolition in 1936, the stables fell into disuse but still stand in a ruinous state, and are listed at Grade II. Ty Uchaf remains and is also a Grade II listed building. The gardens and park surrounding the house are listed Grade II* on the Cadw/ICOMOS Register of Parks and Gardens of Special Historic Interest in Wales.

Gallery

Notes

References

Sources
 
 
 
 

Grade II listed buildings in Monmouthshire
Country houses in Monmouthshire
Grade II listed houses in Wales
Registered historic parks and gardens in Monmouthshire